Maryia Papova (born 13 July 1994) is a Belarusian basketball player for Galatasaray and the Belarusian national team, where she participated at the 2014 FIBA World Championship.

References

1994 births
Living people
Belarusian women's basketball players
Power forwards (basketball)
People from Babruysk
Basketball players at the 2016 Summer Olympics
Olympic basketball players of Belarus
Galatasaray S.K. (women's basketball) players
Belarusian expatriate basketball people in Turkey
Sportspeople from Mogilev Region